Journal of Drug Targeting is a peer-reviewed medical journal published by Informa that covers research on all aspects of drug delivery and drug targeting for molecular and macromolecular drugs. The editor in chief is Saghir Akhtar (College of Medicine, Qatar University).

Abstracting and indexing 
The journal is abstracted and indexed in BIOBASE/Current Awareness in Biological Sciences, BIOSIS Previews, Chemical Abstracts Service, Current Contents/Life Sciences, EMBASE/Excerpta Medica, Index Medicus/MEDLINE, Science Citation Index, and Scopus.

References

External links 
 

Publications established in 1993
Pharmacology journals
Taylor & Francis academic journals
English-language journals